The Felician Sisters, officially known as the Congregation of Sisters of St. Felix of Cantalice Third Order Regular of St. Francis of Assisi (CSSF), is a religious institute of pontifical right whose members profess public vows of chastity, poverty, and obedience and follow the evangelical way of life in common. This active-contemplative religious institute was founded in Warsaw, Poland, in 1855, by Sophia Truszkowska, and named for a shrine of St. Felix, a 16th-century Capuchin saint especially devoted to children.

History

Foundation
When Sophia Camille Truszkowska was twelve years of age, her family moved to Warsaw where her father took up the position of Registrar of Deeds. Initially, she wished to become a Visitation nun, but in 1854 she joined the Society of St. Vincent de Paul and began to work among the poor. With her father’s financial assistance, she rented a flat in order to care for several orphaned girls and aged women. Sophia was joined in her work by her cousin and close friend, Clothilde Ciechanowska. Later that year they became lay members of the Franciscan Third Order. On the Feast of the Presentation of the Blessed Virgin Mary, November 21, 1855, while praying before an icon of Our Lady of Czestochowa, they solemnly dedicated themselves to do the will of Jesus Christ in all things. Hereafter this was recorded as the official founding day of the Congregation of the Sisters of St. Felix of Cantalice.

People began calling them "Sisters of St. Felix." in reference to the shrine of St. Felix of Cantalice at a nearby Capuchin church. They were popularly referred to as "Felician Sisters," the name by which the community is still known. In 1857, she and several associates took the Franciscan habit. Sophia took the new name of Mary Angela. In 1869 health problems caused her to withdraw from administration of the Congregation. She spent the next thirty years on assignments in the garden and greenhouse, tending flowers for the chapel and in the liturgical vestment sewing room, embroidering altar cloths and chasubles. She died at the provincial house in Kraków on October 10, 1899. Mother Mary Angela Truszkowska was beatified by Pope John Paul II in 1993.

Expansion
The Felician sisters came to the United States in 1874, at the invitation of Rev. Joseph Dabrowski, pastor of St. Joseph Parish in Polonia, Wisconsin. There they taught in the parish school. Eventually some relocated to Detroit, MI, where they taught school starting in 1880 at St. Albertus's school. By 1900, they were responsible for the teaching of two-thirds of all Polish Catholic children in Poletown as they staffed St. Albertus, St. Casimir, St. Josaphat, and St. Stanislav. 

In 1947 Felician Sisters of Our Lady of the Angels Province, Enfield, Connecticut, accepted an offer to purchase the Paine Private Hospital located in Bangor, Maine; the name of the facility was changed to St. Joseph Hospital.

Eventually, their work spread to Canada and Haiti.

Religious habit
Most Felician Sisters maintain the religious garb of their Foundress, Blessed Mary Angela Truszkowska, consisting of a brown habit (beige during summer months), scapular, (jacket at specified times), headdress, black veil, collar, Felician wooden crucifix suspended on tape or cord, and simple ring received at final profession.  This remains a  discipline in the Kraków, Przemyśl and Warsaw provinces in Poland, and a treasured tradition in the former Livonia and Enfield provinces in North America.  At the 1994 General Chapter, a proposal passed allowing the sisters to wear an alternate habit consisting of a brown, black, beige or white skirt, blazer, suit or jumper along with a white blouse.  Sisters wearing the alternate habit wear the Felician Crucifix along with the ring received at final profession and may wear it with our without a veil.

Ministry
The Felician Sisters have always sought to harmonize a deep spiritual and community life with dedication to diverse acts of mercy.  As of 2014, there were 1,800 professed members of the Felician Sisters, with about 700 in the North American Province. They use the abbreviation/post-nominal C.S.S.F. (Congregation of the Sisters of St. Felix).

They remain active in education, operating, among other facilities, the St. Mary Child Care Center in Livonia, Michigan; Immaculate Conception High School, founded in 1915 in Lodi, New Jersey; and Villa Maria College in Buffalo, New York. Built on the site of a former Felician orphanage, Our Lady of Grace Village in Newark, Delaware is a 60-unit affordable housing community. The St. Felix Centre in Toronto, Canada offers  Respite services. 
In Holly, Michigan, they run the Maryville Retreat Center.

Volunteers in Mission Program
As part of the Catholic Volunteer Network, the North American Province has a Felician Volunteers in Mission (VIM) program which offers both short and long-term service opportunities to lay men and women interested in partnering with the Felician Sisters to serve, with compassion, mercy and joy, the disadvantaged and underserved.

Provinces

 Immaculate Heart of Mary, Kraków, Poland (1861)
 Our Lady of Czestochowa, Przemyśl, Poland (1910)
 Our Lady Queen of Poland, Warsaw, Poland (1922)
 Nossa Senhora Aparecida, Curitiba, Paraná, Brazil (1950)
 Our Lady Mediatrix of Graces, Rome, Italy (1953) (Generalate)

In North America, the Felician Sisters have ministered primarily to Polish Americans since their arrival from Poland in 1874.  The sisters provided social mobility for young Polish women. Although the congregation was involved in the care of orphans, the aged, and the sick, teaching remained its primary concern.

 Our Lady of Hope, North America (2009), an amalgamation of the following eight provinces:
 Presentation of the Blessed Virgin Mary, Livonia, Michigan USA (1874)
 Immaculate Heart of Mary, Buffalo, New York USA (1900)
 Mother of Good Counsel, Chicago, Illinois USA (1910)
 Immaculate Conception, Lodi, New Jersey USA (1913)
 Our Lady of the Sacred Heart, Coraopolis, Pennsylvania USA (1920)
 Our Lady of the Angels, Enfield, Connecticut USA (1932)
 Assumption of the Blessed Virgin Mary, Rio Rancho, New Mexico USA (1953)
 Holy Name of Mary Mississauga, Ontario Canada (1964)

See also
 Josaphata Hordashevska student of the Felicians who went on to become a religious founder, teacher, and missionary
 Holy Name of Mary Catholic Secondary School
 Holy Name of Mary College School
 St. Florian Church (Hamtramck, Michigan)
 St. Adalbert Parish, South Bend, Indiana
 Our Lady of Mount Carmel Parish (Wyandotte, Michigan)

References

Further reading
Mardi Link (2009), Isadore's Secret: Sin, Murder, and Confession in a Northern Michigan Town, University of Michigan Press.
Thaddeus C.  Radzialowski, "Reflections on the History of the Felicians in America," Polish American Studies (1975) 21#1 pp  19–28

External links
 Felician Sisters Congregational website
Summary at Felician University
 Encyclopedia of Oklahoma History and Culture - Felician Sisters
Pope John Paul II, ''Address to the Sisters of Saint Felix of Cantalice", Libreria Editrice Vaticana, June 16, 2000

Congregations of Franciscan sisters
Roman Catholic Archdiocese of Detroit
Polish-American history
Catholic teaching orders
Religious organizations established in 1855
Catholic religious institutes established in the 19th century
Catholic female orders and societies
1855 establishments in the Russian Empire